Cypsela or Kypsela, was an ancient Greek town on the river Hebrus in ancient Thrace, which was once an important place on the Via Egnatia.
Antiochus besieged Cypsela and its citizens surrendered and became allies with Antiochus. 

Its site is located near the modern İpsala.

See also
Greek colonies in Thrace

References

Populated places in ancient Thrace
Former populated places in Turkey
Greek colonies in Thrace
History of Edirne Province